Rúben Faria Ribeiro (born 16 December 1995) is a Portuguese professional footballer who plays as a left-back for Spanish club Racing Rioja CF.

He played 45 games in his country's second tier for Santa Clara, Sporting B and C.D. Aves, but spent most of his career in the third division for a variety of teams.

Club career
Born in Quinta do Conde, Sesimbra, Ribeiro concluded his development at Sporting CP, and was loaned to C.D. Santa Clara on the final day of the January 2015 transfer window. He made his debut on 8 February by starting in a 1–1 home draw in Segunda Liga against S.C. Farense.

In 2015–16, Ribeiro played regularly for Sporting CP B in the same league, scoring his first career goal on 2 April in a 2–2 draw at F.C. Penafiel. On 31 August, he severed his link with the Lions and signed a two-year deal with C.D. Aves in the second tier.

After playing a small role in Aves' promotion as champions in 2017, Ribeiro dropped into the third tier to play for S.U. Sintrense, signing an agreement in January 2018 to join Primeira Liga team Belenenses SAD. He never took to the field for the Estádio Nacional club, being loaned to Clube Olímpico do Montijo and C.D. Fátima in division three.

After a spell in the reserve team, Ribeiro left B-SAD in 2021 for C.U. Idanhense, newly promoted to the fourth tier. A year later, after their relegation, he moved abroad for the first time to Racing Rioja CF in the Spanish equivalent.

International career
Ribeiro earned 12 caps for Portugal from under-18 to under-20 level. His debut for the latter came on 27 March 2015 by starting in a 2–0 friendly win over Uzbekistan at the Estádio Municipal Sérgio Conceição in Coimbra.

References

External links

Portuguese League profile 
National team data 

1995 births
Living people
People from Sesimbra
Sportspeople from Setúbal District
Portuguese footballers
Association football defenders
Liga Portugal 2 players
Campeonato de Portugal (league) players
F.C. Barreirense players
Sporting CP B players
C.D. Santa Clara players
C.D. Aves players
S.U. Sintrense players
Belenenses SAD players
Clube Olímpico do Montijo players
C.D. Fátima players
Segunda Federación players
Racing Rioja CF players
Portugal youth international footballers
Portuguese expatriate footballers
Expatriate footballers in Spain
Portuguese expatriate sportspeople in Spain